Diane Rosemary Elson (born 20 April 1946) is a British economist, sociologist and gender and development social scientist. She is Professor Emerita of sociology at the University of Essex and a former professor of development studies at the University of Manchester.

She is noted for her work on issues of development and human rights. A theme in her more recent work is gender inequality and economic and social rights. She is the author of the books Male Bias in the Development Process, and Budgeting for Women's Rights: Monitoring Government Budgets for Compliance with CEDAW (Concepts and Tools), and of many other publications and articles.

She has also worked as a special advisor for UNIFEM and is the chair of the UK's Women's Budget Group. She was a winner of the Leontief Prize for Advancing the Frontiers of Economic Thought for 2016, along with Amit Bhaduri.

Biography 
Elson was born on 20 April 1946 in Bedworth, Warwickshire, England, the daughter of Edwin and Vera Elson.

In 1968, she gained a degree in philosophy, politics and economics (PPE) from St Hilda's College, Oxford University, and her doctorate in economics from the University of Manchester in 1994.

Elson has a son.

Career 

 1968 – 1971 Research Assistant, Institute of Commonwealth Studies and St Antony's College, Oxford
 1971 – 1975 Teaching fellow, Department of Economics, University of York 
 1975 – 1977 Research officer, Institute of Development Studies, University of Sussex 
 1978 – 1979 Temporary lecturer, University of Manchester
 1979 – 1984 Part-time consultant and occasional lecturer, University of Manchester
 1984 – 1985 Honorary resident fellow, International Development Centre and Department of Sociology, University of Manchester
 1985 – 1991 Lecturer, University of Manchester
 1992 – 1995 Reader, Development Economics, University of Manchester
 1995 – 1998 Professor of development studies, University of Manchester
 1998 – 2000 Special advisor, United Nations Development Fund for Women (UNIFEM)
 1998 – 2000 Member, United Nations Taskforce on Millennium Development Goals
 2000 – 2012 Professor of Sociology, University of Essex, now Emeritus
 2008 – 2010 Strategic Res. Bd. Economic and Social Research Council (ESRC)
 2012 onwards Advisor, United Nations Entity for Gender Equality and the Empowerment of Women (UN Women)

Selected publications

Books

Chapters in books

Journals and booklets 
 
 
 
  Pdf version
 
 
  Pdf version

See also 
 Feminist economics
 List of feminist economists

References

External links
UNRISD

1946 births
Academics of the University of Essex
Academics of the Victoria University of Manchester
Alumni of St Hilda's College, Oxford
Alumni of the Victoria University of Manchester
Development specialists
Academics of the University of Oxford
Feminist economists
Living people
People from Bedworth
British officials of the United Nations
British sociologists
British women sociologists